The Allen County Courthouse is located at the block surrounded by Clinton/Calhoun/Main/Berry Streets in downtown Fort Wayne, Indiana, the county seat of Allen County.  Built between 1897 and 1902, it is a nationally significant example of Beaux-Arts architecture.  It was listed on the National Register of Historic Places in 1976 and was designated a National Historic Landmark on July 31, 2003.

History
Designed by Brentwood S. Tolan, construction began in 1897, the cornerstone was laid November 17, 1897. The building was dedicated September 23, 1902, with a final cost of $817,553.59 ($250 million today). On September 23, 2002, the building was re-dedicated on its centennial after a seven-year restoration effort, which cost $8.6 million.

Architectural details
The Beaux-Arts architecture-style structure includes such features as four  murals by Charles Holloway, twenty-eight different kinds of scagliola covering , bas-reliefs and art glass. Each of the five court rooms has its own color scheme.

Atop the building is a -high copper-clad domed rotunda, itself topped by a  statue wind vane of Lady Liberty. The larger than life statue has feet that would wear a woman's shoe size of 28.

The building materials include Bedford Limestone and Vermont granite with  Italian marble details. A tunnel was constructed to connect the Courthouse with the City-County Building located across the street. The Courthouse also houses a fallout shelter underground. The skylights originally built into the building were covered during World War II and replaced with artificial light.

The 2001 National Historic Landmark Nomination says in its opening paragraph: "An elaborate combination of Greek, Roman, and Renaissance influences, the massive courthouse reflects the exuberant ambition of late nineteenth century America."

See also
List of tallest buildings in Fort Wayne
List of National Historic Landmarks in Indiana

Notes

References
 Hawfield, Michael and Michael Westfall, The Allen County Court House: A National Treasure Restored'.  The Allen County Court House Preservation Trust, Guild Press, 2002.''

External links

County courthouses in Indiana
Courthouses on the National Register of Historic Places in Indiana
National Historic Landmarks in Indiana
National Register of Historic Places in Fort Wayne, Indiana
Government buildings completed in 1902
Buildings and structures in Fort Wayne, Indiana
Government of Fort Wayne, Indiana
Clock towers in Indiana
1902 establishments in Indiana
Stone buildings
Beaux-Arts architecture in Indiana